When Love Comes Along is a 1998 New Zealand drama film directed by Garth Maxwell. The film was produced by Jonathan Dowling and Michele Fantl.

Cast
 Simon Prast
 Nancy Brunning
 Sophia Hawthorne
 Simon Westaway
 Judith Gibson
 Barret Irwin
 Yolan Moodley
 Jon Brazier
 Celia Nicholson
 Grant Triplow
 Lulu Alach
 John Dybvig
 Irene Drake
 Paul Adams
 Bill Fitzgerald
 Gary Sullivan
 Nic Smith
 Nik Beachman
 Alex Jarman
 Meighan Desmond

References

External links
 

1998 films
New Zealand drama films
1998 drama films
Films set in 1998
Films set in New Zealand
1990s English-language films
LGBT-related drama films
1998 LGBT-related films
New Zealand LGBT-related films